Ore Oduba  (born 17 November 1986) is a British television and radio presenter who has also worked as an actor. From 2008 until 2013, he presented the CBBC news programme Newsround.  In 2018 he hosted the game show And They're Off! in aid of Sport Relief. In 2019 he began his musical theatre career, starring in the UK tour of Grease. He also appeared alongside Jason Manford in Curtains the Musical. Oduba made his West End debut in January 2020. However, he is best known for winning the fourteenth series of BBC One's Strictly Come Dancing in 2016.

Early life and education
Oduba was born on 17 November 1986 in London, to Nigerian parents and was brought up in Wimborne Minster, Dorset, in southwest England, with his brother and two sisters. He often travelled between the UK and Nigeria, where his father is a leading lawyer. He was educated at Dumpton School, then Canford School, a co-educational independent school for both boarding and day pupils in the village of Canford Magna, near to the market town of Wimborne Minster in Dorset. 

Oduba was a talented sports player in his youth, he was a rugby prop, a hockey goalkeeper, also played tennis and cricket.

He studied Sports Science and Social Science at Loughborough University and graduated with a degree in 2008.

Career 
Oduba had always aimed for a career in sports broadcasting, and initially joined The Network, an Edinburgh television festival scheme.

Oduba joined Newsround in August 2008, following the departure of Lizo Mzimba and Laura Jones. His first role on the programme was as a reporter and breakfast bulletin presenter. He was quickly promoted to deputy presenter in 2009, filling in for main presenter Sonali Shah in her absence. In 2010, he joined Shah to begin presenting the main Newsround bulletin double-headed. This continued until Shah's departure in November 2011. He was later joined by reporters Leah Gooding and Hayley Cutts. As part of his role he also presented spin-off show Sportsround. He became the main presenter in October 2008 when the show relaunched. He presented until its cancellation in 2010. The show was replaced by Match of the Day Kickabout which Oduba also presents. Oduba left Newsround in 2013.

Oduba formerly presented the sport for BBC Breakfast and BBC Radio 5 Live. He has also presented and reported on British Olympic Dreams along with former Newsround co-presenter Sonali Shah. Oduba began a debut presenting solo on the morning slot for the 2014 Commonwealth Games on BBC One and BBC Sport.

Oduba regularly appeared on CBBC studio presentation following his Newsround shift. He was also a guest on CBBC shows including Sam & Mark's TMi Friday, Hacker Time and All Over the Place.

In the lead up to the 2012 Summer Olympics Oduba presented a programme called Ultimate Sports Day for CBBC. He also co-presents live cinema relays from the Royal Opera House, Covent Garden, with former ballerina Darcey Bussell.

On 2 March 2013, Oduba and Sonali Shah appeared on the BBC's Let's Dance for Comic Relief, dancing to Hey Ya! by Outkast. They were eliminated and did not get through to the final.

He played the role of Nathan in Hacker Time on CBBC. Since 2015, he has guest presented numerous episodes of The One Show.

From 2015–16, he was a presenter on The National Lottery Draws on Saturday evenings and he presented the 2015 New Year Live programme on BBC One.

From 7 March 2016, Oduba took part in a challenge for Sport Relief, called "Hell on High Seas", in which he sailed 1,000 miles from Belfast to London with five other celebrities including Alex Jones and Suzi Perry. In 2016, he also presented Sport Relief: Clash of the Titans with Dan Walker. He presented coverage of the 2016 Summer Olympics on BBC Four throughout August 2016.

Between October 2012 and May 2017 he presented the daytime BBC One insurance fraud documentary programme Claimed and Shamed. In November 2016, Oduba guest presented an episode of This Morning with Holly Willoughby on ITV. He returned to present a second episode with Willoughby in March 2017 and a third with Davina McCall in February 2018.

In 2016 Oduba participated in the fourteenth series of Strictly Come Dancing, where he was partnered with Joanne Clifton. The couple's American Smooth to "Singin' in the Rain" won praise from Patricia Ward, widow of Gene Kelly. In the fourth week the couple were awarded a score of 39 points out of 40 for their jive to "Runaway Baby" by Bruno Mars. In the final, on 17 December, after the couple scored the maximum 40 points for both their showdance and their jive, they were announced as the winners.

In 2017, Oduba sat in for Claudia Winkleman and Steve Wright, on their respective BBC Radio 2 shows, on a number of occasions.

In 2018, Oduba presented Saturday night game show And They're Off! For Sport Relief on BBC One. Subsequently, he co-hosted the main coverage of Sport Relief 2018 live on BBC One. The same year, he co-presented Britain's Favourite Walks: Top 100 alongside Julia Bradbury for ITV. Oduba also hosts the BBC One game show Hardball.

Oduba made his musical theatre debut in 2019, playing the role of Teen Angel in the UK tour of Grease. He shared the role with singer Peter Andre. Following that, he starred as Aaron Fox in Kander and Ebb's Curtains alongside Jason Manford and Carley Stenson. The production later transferred to London's Wyndham's Theatre, where Oduba made his West End debut.

In 2020, Oduba played the role of news anchor Akintola in the BBC One drama Noughts + Crosses, a television adaptation of the novels by author Malorie Blackman.

The following year, he was a contestant in Channel 4's Celebrity SAS: Who Dares Wins, making it to the final. In the same year, he joined the cast of the stage version of The Rocky Horror Show.

Personal life
Oduba married TV researcher Portia in November 2015; the couple have two children. 

In July 2017, he received an Honorary Doctorate from Loughborough University. In November that year, he received an Honorary Doctorate of Arts from Bournemouth University. He is an avid supporter of Manchester United.

Oduba was the first winner of the Inspirational Public Figure Award at the inaugural Ethnicity Awards held in 2018. Other nominations included Meghan Markle, Chiwetel Ejiofor and Alesha Dixon.

Credits

TV

Television guest appearances 

Hacker Time (2011)
The Dog Ate My Homework (2014)
Celebrity Mastermind (2014)
Play to the Whistle (2017)
Extra Gear (2017)
Weekend (2017)
Celebrity Juice (2017)
The Crystal Maze: Celebrity Special (2017)
Dara O Briain's Go 8 Bit (2017)
Partners in Rhyme (2017)
Tim Vine Travels in Time (2017)
Celebrity Antiques Road Trip (2017)
Would I Lie to You? (2017)
Through the Keyhole (2018)
Celebrity Catchphrase (2018)

Radio

Stage

References

External links
Official website
Official Twitter

1986 births
People from London
Living people
Alumni of Loughborough University
BBC sports presenters and reporters
Black British television personalities
English people of Nigerian descent
English television presenters
Newsround presenters
People educated at Canford School
Strictly Come Dancing winners